Arms and the Woman is a 1916 American silent drama film directed by George Fitzmaurice and starring Mary Nash, Lumsden Hare and H. Cooper Cliffe. It has been described as  Edward G. Robinson's film debut, but the AFI Catalog of Feature Films states this claim is made only in some sources, as well as the film's sets having been designed by art director Anton Grot. It was shot in Jersey City, New Jersey.

Cast
 Mary Nash as Rozika 
 Lumsden Hare as David Fravoe 
 H. Cooper Cliffe as Captain Halliday 
 Robert Broderick as Marcus 
 Rosalind Ivan as Marcus' Wife 
 Carl Harbaugh as Carl 
 Edward G. Robinson as Factory Worker (uncredited)

References

Bibliography
 Robert Beck. The Edward G. Robinson Encyclopedia. McFarland, 2002.

External links
 

1916 films
1916 drama films
1910s English-language films
American silent feature films
Silent American drama films
American black-and-white films
Films directed by George Fitzmaurice
Pathé Exchange films
1910s American films